Dastjerd (also known as Dasteh Jerd and Dast-ī-Jīrd) is a village in Raheb Rural District, in the Central District of Kabudarahang County, Hamadan Province, Iran. At the 2006 census, its population was 3,390, in 765 families.

References 

Populated places in Kabudarahang County